Jackson Leroy Adair (February 23, 1887 – January 19, 1956) was a United States representative from Illinois and a United States district judge of the United States District Court for the Southern District of Illinois.

Education and career

Adair was born in Clayton, Illinois, attending public high school, and Illinois College in Jacksonville, Illinois. He graduated from the University of Michigan Law School in 1911 with a Bachelor of Laws. He was admitted to the bar the same year and commenced practice in Muskogee, Oklahoma. He moved to Quincy, Illinois, in 1913 and continued the practice of law. He also engaged in agricultural pursuits and in the manufacture of medicine for livestock. He served as city attorney of Quincy from 1914 to 1916. He served as prosecuting attorney of Adams County, Illinois from 1916 to 1920 and from 1924 to 1928. He was in private practice in Adams County from 1920 to 1924. He served as member of the Illinois Senate from 1928 to 1932, from the 36th District.

Congressional service

Adair was elected as a Democrat to the 73rd and 74th United States Congresses, serving from March 4, 1933, to January 3, 1937. He was not a candidate for renomination in 1936.

Federal judicial service

Adair was nominated by President Franklin D. Roosevelt on March 24, 1937, to a seat on the United States District Court for the Southern District of Illinois vacated by Judge James Earl Major. He was confirmed by the United States Senate on April 20, 1937, and received his commission on April 27, 1937. His service terminated on January 19, 1956, due to his death in Quincy. He was interred in South Side Cemetery in Clayton.

References

Sources
 
 
 
 

1887 births
1956 deaths
Democratic Party Illinois state senators
Judges of the United States District Court for the Southern District of Illinois
United States district court judges appointed by Franklin D. Roosevelt
20th-century American judges
University of Michigan Law School alumni
Democratic Party members of the United States House of Representatives from Illinois